Presidential elections were held in Transvaal on 16 April 1883. The election was held after the country's triumvarate leadership, consisting of Paul Kruger, Piet Joubert and Marthinus Wessel Pretorius, was abolished. The result was a victory for Kruger, who was sworn in on 9 May.

Results

References

Elections in Transvaal
Transvaal
1883 in the South African Republic
1880s in Transvaal